Mandalay Bay Convention Center is attached to the Mandalay Bay resort, located on the Las Vegas Strip in Paradise, Nevada. The  facility is owned and operated by MGM Resorts International. It is among the largest convention centers in the U.S.

It was developed by original owner Mandalay Resort Group, at a cost of $236 million. Construction began in 2001, but was temporarily halted due to the economic impact of the September 11 attacks. MGM acquired the facility two years later. An expansion was finished in 2015, and renovations concluded the following year.

History
In April 2001, Mandalay Resort Group announced plans to build a convention center for its Mandalay Bay resort, located on the Las Vegas Strip. The facility would occupy 16.5 acres located southwest of Mandalay Bay. The resort already had  of convention and meeting space, and the new facility would add . In addition to Mandalay Bay, the convention center would attract business from the Luxor and Excalibur resorts, also built by Mandalay Resort Group and located directly north. The facility was originally expected to be finished in mid-2002. Construction began in June 2001, but was subsequently put on hold for nearly six months, due to the economic impact of the September 11 attacks. The facility was topped out on July 11, 2002.

It was among the largest convention centers in the U.S., and the second largest local facility, surpassed only by the Las Vegas Convention Center. Its first event was the Aqua Show, which focused on the pool and spa industry. The convention center has three floors, and the layout allows the facility to be divided into 75 rooms. The convention center failed to meet expectations initially. MGM Mirage acquired the facility and Mandalay Bay in 2005, and convention bookings improved under the new ownership. Convention business makes up a significant portion of the resort's revenue.

In 2013, Mandalay Bay partnered with NRG Energy to add 21,324 solar panels on the facility's roof, capable of supporting up to 20 percent of the resort's energy needs.

A $66 million expansion of the convention center was announced in April 2014, adding  of exhibit space and 900 additional underground parking spaces. Renovations to the existing facilities concluded in January 2016, with second-floor space converted into the  Oceanside Ballroom. The convention center includes three kitchens which provide catering for events.

A $100 million remodeling project was underway in 2022, and is expected to be complete by 2025.

See also
 List of convention centers in the Las Vegas Valley

References

External links

 

2003 establishments in Nevada
Buildings and structures in Paradise, Nevada
Convention centers in the Las Vegas Valley
Event venues established in 2003
Convention Center
Darts venues